The Berawan – Lower Baram languages are a group of half a dozen languages spoken in Borneo.

Languages
Berawan
Lower Baram: Belait, Kiput, Lelak, Narom, Tutong

References